The John and Elizabeth Shaw Sundy House is a historic home in Delray Beach, Florida, United States. It is located at 106 South Swinton Avenue. On January 16, 1992, it was added to the U.S. National Register of Historic Places.

References

External links

 Palm Beach County listings at National Register of Historic Places
 Florida's Office of Cultural and Historical Programs
 Palm Beach County listings
 Sundy House

Houses on the National Register of Historic Places in Florida
Delray Beach, Florida
National Register of Historic Places in Palm Beach County, Florida
Houses in Palm Beach County, Florida
Vernacular architecture in Florida